Lucifer Chu (born February 19, 1975) graduated from Taiwan's National Central University in 1998 with a BS degree in electrical engineering. He dedicated himself to promoting fantasy literature because of his passion for video games and fantasy fiction. He translated J. R. R. Tolkien's The Hobbit and The Lord of the Rings into Chinese. He also translated Dragonlance Chronicle, published in 1998. He has translated 30 fantasy novels into Chinese.

Career
Chu is the founder of the Foundation of Fantasy Culture and Art as well as the Open Source Open Courseware Prototype System (OOPS).  He learned English by playing computer games and writing reviews and walk-throughs for gaming magazines, and later by working as a professional translator of fantasy novels. He is the author of five Chinese books and translator of more than twenty fantasy novels.

An ex-millionaire, he claimed in several speeches that he spent almost all the royalties earned from The Hobbit and The Lord of the Rings trilogy on open education, localizing open knowledge and encouraging young people's innovation.

The OOPS is a volunteer-based localization project with the goal of translating open knowledge into Chinese. Over 20,000 volunteers are estimated to have joined the OOPS.

He has spoken at education seminars.

References

External links
 Open source open courseware prototype system 

1975 births
Living people
Taiwanese translators
English–Chinese translators
Writers from Taipei
Taiwanese Internet celebrities
20th-century Taiwanese writers
21st-century Taiwanese writers